Scott Lipsky and David Martin are the defending champions, but lost in the First Round to Eric Butorac and Ashley Fisher.

Seeds

Draw

Draw

References

Doubles